The Kuwait Metropolitan Rapid Transit System Project is a developing metro network in Kuwait. The metro project is currently in the design stage.

Construction
According to MEED in 2021, the metro project is currently in the design stage. It is now a PPP project under the management of the Kuwait Authority for Partnership Projects (KAPP).  The government will own 10% of the project and raise 50% of the funds through an initial public offer. The remaining 40% will be held by the private developer.

The government Partnerships Technical Bureau was to begin procurement in 2012, using PPP contracts. However, tendering is now scheduled for 2021. A January 2020 article in Gulf Business outlined that the metro is "to be constructed" with no timeframe given.

Routes
Four lines will be built in five phases, to total 160 km with 69 stations.

 Line 1: 23.7 km, 19 stations, +57.3 km extension
 Line 2: 21 km, 27 stations, +16.4 km extension
 Line 3: 24 km, 15 stations
 Line 4: 22.7 km, 17 stations

See also
Transport in Kuwait
Kuwait City

References

External links
 Kuwait Metropolitan Rapid Transit System (government website)

Proposed rapid transit